is a Japanese voice actress from Kumamoto Prefecture who is affiliated with I'm Enterprise. She began her career in 2016, and in 2018 she played her first main role as Akari Amano in the anime television series Ms. Vampire who lives in my neighborhood.

Biography 
Sasahara learned to play the piano at a young age and dreamed of becoming a singer during her elementary school years. She was persuaded against pursuing that career by her parents, who advised her that becoming one was difficult. While in junior high school, she played the clarinet as a member of her school's brass band. Around this time, she was encouraged to pursue a career in voice acting by her father, who told her that she could sing, act, and appear on TV in that line of work. Her father then encouraged her by printing out an audition form for a role in the Japanese dub of the film The Golden Compass, although she ultimately did not push through with auditioning. Nevertheless, as she had already been interested in anime and manga, the experience influenced her to investigate voice acting more and learn about anime production.

During her third year of high school, Sasahara applied for enrollment at the Japan Narration Acting Institute. After passing the entrance examinations, she enrolled at the school while also going to university. While in her third year of training, she received a notification that the she had been accepted into the I'm Enterprise talent agency; she then debuted as a voice actress in 2016. Among her earliest roles was as the character Li Xuelan in the 2018 anime series Märchen Mädchen. Later that year, she was cast in her first main role as the character Akari Amano in the anime series Ms. Vampire who lives in my neighborhood. The following year, she was cast as Rū Hitoma in the anime series Over Drive Girl 1/6 and Rin Namiki in the multimedia franchise Kandagawa Jet Girls.  In 2020, she was cast as Yūki Kuroiwa in the anime series Diary of Our Days at the Breakwater.  In 2021, she was cast as Emilico in the anime series Shadows House.

Filmography

Anime
2016
Love Live! Sunshine!! as Female student
Classicaloid as Child

2017
Urara Meirocho
Minami Kamakura High School Girls Cycling Club as Marie Unuma

2018
Dagashi Kashi 2
Märchen Mädchen as Li Xuelan
Happy Sugar Life as Mei Kunizuka (episodes 2, 4)
Kyōto Teramachi Sanjō no Holmes as Kumi Kitamoto (episode 4)
Ms. Vampire Who Lives in My Neighborhood as Akari Amano

2019
Over Drive Girl 1/6 as Rū Hitoma
Kandagawa Jet Girls as Rin Namiki

2020
Asteroid in Love as Girl
Diary of Our Days at the Breakwater as Yūki Kuroiwa
Listeners as Loudspeaker, Grange & Anorak Brothers, Minami Girl
Mewkledreamy as Women (2), Moderator
Lapis Re:Lights as Salsa
Dropout Idol Fruit Tart as Nua Nakamachi

2021
Shadows House as Emilico
Platinum End as Akira

2022
Shadows House 2nd Season as Emilico

2023
The Magical Revolution of the Reincarnated Princess and the Genius Young Lady as Tilty Claret
Dark Gathering as Yayoi Hōzuki

Games
Lapis Re:Lights as Salsa
Uma Musume Pretty Derby as Curren Chan
Kandagawa Jet Girls as Rin Namiki
Azur Lane as USS Boise
Birdie Crush as Lucie de Bei
Azure Striker Gunvolt 3 as Kirin 
Gunvolt Chronicles: Luminous Avenger iX 2 as Kirin

References

External links
 Agency profile 
 

I'm Enterprise voice actors
Japanese voice actresses
Living people
Voice actresses from Kumamoto Prefecture
Year of birth missing (living people)